= Fanny Berlin =

Russian woman lawyer

Fanny Berlin (born 8 or 15 November 1852 in Vitebsk, died 1899 in Saint Petersburg) was the first woman who received her doctorate in Europe as a lawyer (Bern, 1878). The Bernese intelligentsia newspaper considered that this legal doctorate examination of a lady was one of the first at the continental universities at all.
